Botta's serotine (Eptesicus bottae) is a species of vesper bat, one of 25 in the genus Eptesicus.
It is found in rocky areas and temperate desert.

Taxonomy and etymology
It was described as a new species in 1869 by German naturalist Wilhelm Peters. Peters placed it in the now-defunct bat genus Vesperus with a binomial of V. bottae. The holotype was collected in southwestern Yemen.by Paul-Émile Botta in 1837. Botta is the eponym for the species name "bottae." In 1878, George Edward Dobson wrote that he considered it synonymous with the serotine bat, Vesperugo (=Eptesicus) serotinus. By 1967, it was referred to as its present name combination, Eptesicus bottae.

From 1976 until 2006, the closely-related species Eptesicus anatolicus was widely considered a part of E. bottae, despite E. anatolicus being separately identified in 1971. This conception was largely overturned by Benda and colleagues in 2006. Until 2013, Ognev's serotine (E. ognevi) was also considered a part of E. bottae, until genetic analyses confirmed both as distinct species.

Description

Range and habitat
It is found in several countries bordering the eastern part of the Mediterranean Sea and the Middle East. It can be found in Egypt, Iran, Iraq, Israel, Jordan, Oman, State of Palestine, Saudi Arabia, Syrian Arab Republic, the United Arab Emirates, Yemen, and possibly Lebanon.

Conservation
As of 2021, it is evaluated as a least-concern species by the IUCN. Within Egypt, it is considered locally common, though it is less common in other parts of its range.

References

Eptesicus
Mammals described in 1869
Taxa named by Wilhelm Peters
Taxonomy articles created by Polbot
Bats of Asia
Bats of Africa